Philaethria andrei is a butterfly of the family Nymphalidae. It was described by Christian Brévignon in 2002. It is found from southern Venezuela throughout the Guiana Shield to the mouth of the Amazon River in Brazil.

The larvae feed on Passiflora laurifolia.

Subspecies
Philaethria andrei andrei (mouth of Amazon to southern Venezuela)
Philaethria andrei orinocoensis Constantino & Salazar, 2010 (Orinoco Basin in Venezuela)

References

 "Philaethria andrei Brevignon, 2002". Insecta.pro. Retrieved February 6, 2020.

Butterflies described in 2002
Heliconiini
Fauna of Brazil
Nymphalidae of South America